Land of the Blind is a 2006 British-American drama film starring Ralph Fiennes, Donald Sutherland, Tom Hollander and Lara Flynn Boyle.

Land of the Blind is a dark political satire, based on several incidents throughout history in which tyrannical rulers were overthrown by new leaders who proved to be just as bad, if not worse, and several such cases are alluded to. The title is taken from the saying, "In the kingdom of the blind, the one-eyed man is king."

Land of the Blind had its world premiere in competition at the International Film Festival Rotterdam, and was the Opening Night Gala film at the 2006 Human Rights Watch Film Festival in London. Its U.S. premiere was in competition at the 2006 Tribeca Film Festival. The film sparked intense reaction during its festival run, attacked by both left and right, each of which saw the film as a critique of its position.

Plot

Hollander plays Maximilian II (often called Junior), the ignorant, vindictive and petulant ruler of a troubled (but unnamed) country. Maximilian has two main interests: enjoying himself and running his country's movie industry. The output of the nation's film studios under Maximilian is limited to terrible action-adventure schlock with names like Out For Vengeance 4. While it is heavily implied that Junior is a childish sadist, it is conceded that his excesses are only bolstered by the encouragement of his beautiful, yet cruel, wife Josephine (Boyle) and the violence dealt by anti-government terrorists.

Ralph Fiennes plays Joe, a prison warder working at the prison where John Thorne is held at the beginning of the movie. During this early period, Thorne is a wreck, squatting in a shabby cell, enduring frequent beatings from the other guards and writing revolutionary slogans on the walls with his own feces. Joe comes to learn from Thorne and respect him for his bearing and intellect, if not his message. Maximilian, trying to quash spiraling dissent, takes the risk of letting Thorne out of jail, hoping to have him thus become not a great folk hero but another greedy, dishonest politician. Joe, too, is soon promoted to one of the guards at Maximilian's palace and a position in the country's elite military unit. After seeing Junior's madness first hand, it is he who betrays his master by letting Thorne and his followers into the palace's inner chambers while he and Josephine are engaged in a revolting sex game. Thorne shoots the pair, and becomes a ruler governing a country as absolutely totalitarian, if not more so, than the deceased Maximilian. Thorne also encourages separating children from their parents, imposes veganism, bans action movies and eliminates imported medicine all while sending the country's professional classes to grim re-education camps. Frightened females cower underneath burqa-like garments.

For his assistance in assassinating the dictator, Joe is hailed as a hero by Thorne. Nevertheless, as Joe realizes that his one-time friend is just as bad as, if not worse than, his predecessor, he refuses to ally with the new regime. For this, Thorne sends Joe to a re-education camp.

Subjected to numerous cruel beatings and isolation techniques, Joe continually refuses to sign his loyalty oath. At one point Thorne visits but does not recognize his old friend, even after Joe attempts to show him repeatedly who he is. Joe is also accused of being a member of a "hidden" conspiracy within the prison itself. One of his former co-workers, assumedly after being severely beaten, admits to the conspiracy's veracity and accuses Joe of being involved. Joe is quickly brought to the dreaded Room 12. It is there that the audience is revealed to a shocking twist: Joe is accused of never helping Thorne conquer the government, or being a commando in a covert-ops group, but rather a standard recruit in the armed forces discharged after the standard two years. During this, Joe seems to hallucinate heavily, his interrogators becoming characters dead and alive we have seen throughout the film, and is asked once again what is better than a big juicy steak (a recurring question with a wordplay answer, a slogan concerning the obligation of veganism). Throughout the scene it is suggested he may be being tortured mentally or is undergoing a paranoid or psychotic episode. His answer to any of the questions asked is never shown.

We then cut to Thorne being killed in his bath by one of his once loyal followers. The revolutionary government is quickly overthrown. Junior's in-laws and nephew are revealed to have escaped during Thorne's revolution and, having lived in exile, have returned to re-establish the old government (with an outside country's assistance). The head of the camp returns to being a doctor and denies having taken part in the tortures and excesses he ordered, while the tortured co-worker that accused Joe of conspiracy is given a government job. This ex-coworker makes a number of empty promises to get Joe out of the camp as soon as the "political climate" settles, but says that his confession to helping murder Maximilian makes him a sensitive case. For having destroyed the old government, but also never having 'played ball' with the new one, Joe is stuck in limbo, in a prison cell until the end of time. Twelve years later, we find Joe writing his memoirs in a white cell resembling that of a prison's or an asylum's, seemingly oblivious even to his daughter's visits. It is possible that he is insane, or that he is perfectly sane, but the woman that visited was an actor pretending to be his daughter to break him down. She leaves Joe writing his memoirs and exits his cell that is really located in some low end residential apartment complex implying that Joe is not a political prisoner but is under some sort of house arrest being taken care of by the State.

Cast
Ralph Fiennes as Joe
Donald Sutherland as John Thorne (later Chairman Thorne)
Tom Hollander as President Maximilian II (a.k.a. "Junior")
Lara Flynn Boyle as First Lady Josephine
Marc Warren as Pool
Ron Cook as Doc
Robert Daws as Jones
Laura Fraser as Madeleine
Jonathan Hyde as Smith
Camilla Rutherford as Tania
Don Warrington as First Sergeant
Miranda Raison as Daisy, Joe's Daughter
Mackenzie Crook as Editor

Historical references 

Historical references in the film include Jean-Paul Marat (from the French Revolution), Kim Jong-Il, Joseph Stalin, Benito Mussolini, Augusto Pinochet, Anastasio Somoza Debayle, François Duvalier, Rudolf Hess, Jean-Claude Duvalier, Lyndon B. Johnson, Julius Caesar (from William Shakespeare's play), Robert Mugabe, Ngo Dinh Diem, Idi Amin, the PIRA Maze prison protests, U.S. POWs in Vietnam, the Weathermen terrorist group, the Khmer Rouge, the 1979 Revolution in Iran, and the subsequent Cultural Revolution in that country.

Critical reception
The film received mostly negative reviews from critics. Review aggregator Rotten Tomatoes reports that 17% out of 18 professional film critics gave the film a positive review, with a rating average of 4.1/10.

References

External links
 
 "Sitting in the dock of the Bay: Ralph Fiennes talks about movies of conscience", Times Online, 9 March 2006
 "Rights and Wrongs," New Statesman
 Time Out New York, "Land of the Blind"
 "Pretty shocking stuff. A very provocative film," Jeffrey Lyons
 Holden, Stephen. "Meet the New Boss, Once Again, in 'Land of the Blind'", The New York Times, 16 June 2006
 Schwarzbaum, Lisa. Review in Entertainment Weekly
 
 Monsters and Critics Interview: Director Robert Edwards
 "Fiennes, Edwards Lead the 'Blind' Once More in Tribeca," The Reeler
 "Laughing in the Dark with Robert Edwards," GreenCine

2006 films
2006 drama films
American satirical films
2000s English-language films
2000s American films